The Kawanishi K-7 Transport Seaplane was a Japanese single-engined biplane floatplane of the 1920s. Eleven were built from 1924 to 1927, being used to carry passengers and airmail.

Design and development
In December 1923, Eiji Sekiguchi, chief designer of the aircraft department of Kawanishi Kikai Setsakuho (Kawanishi Machinery Manufacturing Works), started design of a new high speed transport floatplane to equip Nippon Koku KK (Japan Aviation Co. Ltd.), an airline subsidiary of Kawanishi. Sekiguchi designed a single-engined sesquiplane (i.e. a biplane with the lower wing much smaller than the upper wing) of all-wooden construction. Seating for four passengers was provided in an enclosed cabin, while the aircraft's two pilots sat in individual open tandem cockpits aft of the passenger cabin. The aircraft was powered by a single Maybach Mb.IVa water-cooled inline-engine providing 305 hp (228 kW), an engine type usually used to power Zeppelins or Riesenflugzeug like the Zeppelin-Staaken R.VI, received as part of Germany's reparations to Japan after the end of the First World War.

The first example of the new aircraft, the K-7A Transport Seaplane was completed in November 1924, demonstrating both good performance and handling. A further nine K-7As were built by the time production ended in 1927, together with a single example of the K-7B Mail-Carrying Aircraft, a modified version that could be operated either on floats or with a tailwheel undercarriage.

Operational history
The K-7A entered service on Nippon Koku'''s service between Osaka and Fukuoka in January 1925, mainly carrying airmail rather than passengers. The K-7A continued in use until 1929, when Nippon Koku was forced to be disbanded, with its routes transferred to the government owned Nihon Koko Yuso KK'' (Japan Air Transport).

Variants
 K-7A Transport Seaplane
Six-seat airliner/transport floatplane, powered by Maybach MIVa engine. Ten built.
 K-7B Mail-carrying Aircraft
Modified version of K-7A, capable of operating with a fixed tailwheel undercarriage or floats, powered by 440 hp (328 kW) Lorraine 1 V12 engine. One built in 1925.

Operators

 Dai Nippon Kōkū Kabushiki Kaisha The Imperial Japanese Airways, in short Nippon Koku KK.

Specifications (K-7A)

References
Notes

Bibliography

 

1920s Japanese airliners
Floatplanes
K-7
Sesquiplanes
Single-engined tractor aircraft
Aircraft first flown in 1924